Brigitte Latrille-Gaudin (born 15 April 1958) is a French fencer. She won a gold, silver and bronze medal in the women's team foil events at three different Olympic Games.

References

External links
 

1958 births
Living people
French female foil fencers
Olympic fencers of France
Fencers at the 1976 Summer Olympics
Fencers at the 1980 Summer Olympics
Fencers at the 1984 Summer Olympics
Fencers at the 1988 Summer Olympics
Olympic gold medalists for France
Olympic silver medalists for France
Olympic bronze medalists for France
Olympic medalists in fencing
Sportspeople from Bordeaux
Medalists at the 1976 Summer Olympics
Medalists at the 1980 Summer Olympics
Medalists at the 1984 Summer Olympics
20th-century French people